James Umpherston (1812 – 28 October 1900) was a farmer and politician, a noted settler of Mount Gambier, South Australia.

Umpherston was born in Cambuslang, Lanarkshire, Scotland, and worked as a farmer until he emigrated to South Australia on the Ariadne, arriving in August 1839.

He worked for several years as a contractor to established farmers until he had saved enough to start farming for himself at Brown Hill Creek, then at Smithfield, where he prospered. Finally he moved to "The Caves", where he remained, turning it into a showpiece and model farm. "The Caves" was later owned by Joseph Botterill MLC.

He was elected to the South Australian House of Assembly seat of Victoria in December 1866 at the by-election brought about by the resignation of Adam Lindsay Gordon, with John Riddoch of Yallum as colleague, and retired in May 1868, succeeded by Henry Kent Hughes.

He died after a brief illness. He was twice married: to Janet Arneil (c. 1811 – 10 January 1877). He married again, to Margaret Ferguson (c. 1842 – 18 March 1919) on 8 March 1878; he had no children.  He had two brothers and a sister who emigrated to South Australia in September 1849 aboard the Macedon:
William J. Umpherston (24 February 1830 – 13 January 1915) of Yahl, South Australia married Sarah Campbell on 21 July 1857.
John Umpherston ( – ) of Mount Gambier married Ellen (c. 1813 – 25 November 1898)
Ann Umpherston (c. 1816 – 29 December 1882) married William Innes of Onetree Hill on 20 April 1854. Their children founded the Mil Lel Cheese and Butter Company.

Other interests
He was appointed Justice of the Peace at Mount Gambier in 1861,
He was a member of the Agricultural and Horticultural Society of Adelaide from its earliest days, and kept up his membership of it to the last, and when he moved to the South-East he helped establish a local Agricultural, Pastoral and Horticultural Society, and was its first President.
He helped found the Mount Gambier District Council, and when it was divided in 1865 became Chairman of the Gambier East Council, and served in that position for 12 years. He helped establish the Mount Gambier Institute and was a founder of the local Caledonian Society, and its Chief for two years.
He was a founding member of the local Agricultural Bureau, and its first President.
He was prominent among the founders of the Mount Gambier Presbyterian Church and was one of its elders and most regular worshippers.
He was a Justice of the Peace, and a member of the Licensing Bench.

References 

Australian farmers
Scottish emigrants to Australia
Members of the South Australian House of Assembly
1812 births
1900 deaths
19th-century Australian politicians